Tennis was first contested as a Summer Olympic sport in the 1896 Olympic Games, held in Athens. In the inaugural Olympic Games, only two tournaments were played: men's singles and men's doubles. Women were allowed to start to compete in singles and mixed doubles tennis events at the Olympic Games in 1900. Between 1928 and 1984, tennis was not included in the official Olympic program. Demonstration tennis events were, however, held twice, first in 1968 and later 1984. It was reinstated as a medal sport in 1988.

Kathleen McKane Godfree (one gold, two silvers, and two bronzes) and Venus Williams (four gold, one silver) are the record holders for the most Olympic medals in tennis. Serena Williams and Venus Williams won a record four gold medals. Reginald Doherty is the record holder for most medals in men's tennis. Andy Murray is the only men's player to have won two singles gold medals.

Only on three occasions has a player won back-to-back gold medals in the same event across two Olympic Games: Gigi Fernández and Mary Joe Fernández in women’s doubles in 1992 and 1996, Serena Williams and Venus Williams in women's doubles in 2008 and 2012, and Andy Murray in the men's singles in 2012 and 2016.

Singles

Men's singles

Women's singles

Doubles

Men's doubles

Women's doubles

Mixed doubles

Discontinued events

Singles (discontinued)

Men's indoor singles

Women's indoor singles

Doubles (discontinued)

Men's indoor doubles

Indoor mixed doubles

Athlete medal leaders

Players currently active in bold.

Men leaders

Men's singles leaders

Women leaders

Women's singles leaders

Medal table

See also
Tennis at the 1906 Intercalated Games — these Intercalated Games are no longer regarded as official Games by the International Olympic Committee
Wheelchair tennis at the Summer Paralympics#Medalists

Notes
 The Olympic medal table is ranked first by the number of gold medals won and then by silver and bronze medals if there is a tie.

References

External links
Olympic Tennis at Sports-Reference.com.
Olympic Tennis at Olympedia.

Tennis
Medalists
Olympic

o